Stetten is a municipality in the canton of Schaffhausen in Switzerland.

Geography

Of this area, 45.6% is used for agricultural purposes, while 44.9% is forested. Of the rest of the land, 9.3% is settled (buildings or roads) and the remainder (0.2%) is non-productive (rivers or lakes).

Coat of arms
The blazon of the municipal coat of arms is Gules, a Moon increscent Or.

Demographics
Stetten has a population of 1,084, of which 16.7% are foreign nationals.  Of the foreign population,, 47.3% are from Germany, 10.2% are from Italy, 2.7% are from Serbia, 0.5% are from Macedonia, 0.5% are from Turkey, and 38.7% are from another country.  Over the last 10 years the population has grown at a rate of 42.1%.  Most of the population speaks German (94.0%), with English being second most common ( 1.4%) and Danish being third ( 1.4%).

The age distribution of the population is children and teenagers (0–19 years old) make up 25.9% of the population, while adults (20–64 years old) make up 59.6% and seniors (over 64 years old) make up 14.5%.

In the 2007 federal election the most popular party was the SVP which received 42.3% of the vote.  The next two most popular parties were the FDP (32.4%), and the SP (25.3%) .

In Stetten about 87.9% of the population (between age 25-64) have completed either non-mandatory upper secondary education or additional higher education (either university or a Fachhochschule).  In Stetten, 3.31% of the population attend kindergarten or another pre-school, 8.04% attend a Primary School, 4.64% attend a lower level Secondary School, and 3.6% attend a higher level Secondary School.

, 20.3% of the population belonged to the Roman Catholic Church and 60.7% belonged to the Swiss Reformed Church.

The historical population is given in the following table:

Economy
Stetten has an unemployment rate of 0.84%.  , there were 18 people employed in the primary economic sector and about 8 businesses involved in this sector.  22 people are employed in the secondary sector and there are 5 businesses in this sector.  62 people are employed in the tertiary sector, with 20 businesses in this sector.

 the mid year average unemployment rate was 1.1%.  There were 32 non-agrarian businesses in the municipality and 24.5% of the (non-agrarian) population was involved in the secondary sector of the economy while 75.5% were involved in the third.  At the same time, 55.5% of the working population was employed full-time, and 44.5% was employed part-time.  There were 110 residents of the municipality who were employed in some capacity, of which females made up 46.4% of the workforce.   there were 62 residents who worked in the municipality, while 319 residents worked outside Stetten and 43 people commuted into the municipality for work.

, there is 1 restaurant and the hospitality industry in Stetten employs 2 people.

Heritage sites of national significance

Herblingen Castle is listed as a Swiss heritage site of national significance.

References

Municipalities of the canton of Schaffhausen
Cultural property of national significance in the canton of Schaffhausen